Dodecastigma is a genus of plants under the family Euphorbiaceae first described as a genus in 1932. It is native to northern South America.

Species
 Dodecastigma amazonicum Ducke - Amazonas State in Brazil
 Dodecastigma integrifolium (Lanj.) Lanj. & Sandwith - French Guiana, Guyana, N Brazil
 Dodecastigma uleanum (Pax & K.Hoffm.) G.L.Webster - Amazonas, Amapá

References

Codiaeae
Euphorbiaceae genera
Taxa named by Adolpho Ducke